The Feldenkrais Method is a type of exercise therapy devised by Israeli Moshé Feldenkrais (1904–1984) during the mid-20th century.  The method is claimed to reorganize connections between the brain and body and so improve body movement and psychological state.

There is no good medical evidence that the Feldenkrais method improves health outcomes. It is not known if it is safe or cost-effective, but researchers do not believe it poses serious risks.

Description 
The Feldenkrais Method is a type of alternative exercise therapy that proponents claim can repair impaired connections between the motor cortex and the body, so benefiting the quality of body movement and improving wellbeing. According to David Gorski, the Feldenkrais Guild of North America claims that the Feldenkrais method allows people to "rediscover [their] innate capacity for graceful, efficient movement" and that "These improvements will often generalize to enhance functioning in other aspects of [their] life". Proponents claim that the Feldenkrais Method can benefit people with a number of medical conditions, including children with autism, and people with multiple sclerosis. However, no studies in which participants were clearly identified as having an autism spectrum disorder or developmental disabilities have been presented to back these claims.

Feldenkrais lessons have two types, one verbally guided and practiced in groups, called Awareness Through Movement and one hands-on and practiced one-to-one called Functional Integration.

Effectiveness and reception
In 2015, the Australian Government's Department of Health published the results of a review of alternative therapies that sought to determine if any were suitable for being covered by health insurance; the Feldenkrais Method was one of 17 therapies evaluated for which no clear evidence of effectiveness was found. Accordingly in 2017 the Australian government identified the Feldenkrais Method as a practice that would not qualify for insurance subsidy, saying this step would "ensure taxpayer funds are expended appropriately and not directed to therapies lacking evidence".

The Feldenkrais Method is promoted with anecdotal claims it can help children with autism and other developmental disorders, but such claims are not backed by reputable supporting evidence.

There is limited evidence that workplace-based use of the Feldenkrais Method may help aid rehabilitation of people with upper limb complaints.

David Gorski has written that the Method bears similarities to faith healing, is like "glorified yoga", and that it "borders on quackery". Quackwatch places the Feldenkrais Method on its list of "Unnaturalistic methods".

History 

From the 1950s till his death in 1984, he taught continuously in his home city of Tel Aviv. Feldenkrais gained recognition in part through media accounts of his work with prominent individuals, including Israeli Prime Minister David Ben-Gurion. Beginning in the late 1950s, Feldenkrais made trips to teach in Europe and America. Several hundred people became certified Feldenkrais practitioners through trainings he held in San Francisco from 1975 to 1978 and in Amherst, Massachusetts, from 1980 to 1984.

Influences 
In David Kaetz's biography, Making Connections: Roots and Resonance in the Life of Moshe Feldenkrais (2007), he argues many lines of influence can be found between the Judaism of Feldenkrais's upbringing and the Feldenkrais Method – for instance, the use of paradox as a pedagogical tool. 

Feldenkrais was critical of the appropriation of the term 'energy' to express immeasurable phenomena or to label experiences that people had trouble describing ... He was impatient when someone invoked energy in pseudoscientific 'explanations' that masked a lack of understanding. In such cases he urged skepticism and scientific discourse. He encouraged empirical and phenomenological narratives that could lead to insights.

Cybernetics, also known as dynamic systems theory, continued to influence the Feldenkrais Method in the 1990s through the work of human development researcher Esther Thelen.:1535

References 

Alternative medicine
Mind–body interventions
Physical exercise
Postural awareness techniques
Somatics